Almas Akram (born 15 April 1988) is a Pakistani former cricketer who played as a left-arm medium-fast bowler and left-handed batter. She appeared in 12 One Day Internationals and four Twenty20 Internationals for Pakistan in 2008 and 2009. She played domestic cricket for Sialkot, Zarai Taraqiati Bank Limited and Balochistan.

References

External links
 
 

1988 births
Living people
People from Nankana Sahib District
Punjabi people
Pakistani women cricketers
Pakistan women One Day International cricketers
Pakistan women Twenty20 International cricketers
Sialkot women cricketers
Zarai Taraqiati Bank Limited women cricketers
Baluchistan women cricketers